Mezzomerico is a comune (municipality) in the Province of Novara in the Italian region Piedmont, located about  northeast of Turin and about  north of Novara.

Mezzomerico borders the following municipalities: Agrate Conturbia, Divignano, Marano Ticino, Oleggio, Suno, and Vaprio d'Agogna.
 
The name of the town shows its origins as Celtic Mediomatrici settlement; the name was attested as Mediomadrigo in 980.

References

Cities and towns in Piedmont